In Fast Company is a 1924 American silent action film directed by James W. Horne and starring Richard Talmadge, Mildred Harris and Sheldon Lewis.

Plot

Cast
 Richard Talmadge as Perry Whitman Jr 
 Mildred Harris as Barbara Belden 
 Sheldon Lewis as Drexel Draig 
 Douglas Gerrard as Reginald Chichester 
 Jack Herrick as The 'Bolivian Bull' 
 Charles Clary as Perry Whitman Sr 
 Snitz Edwards as Mike Ricketts 
 Lydia Yeamans Titus as Maid

References

Bibliography
 Munden, Kenneth White. The American Film Institute Catalog of Motion Pictures Produced in the United States, Part 1. University of California Press, 1997.

External links
 

1924 films
1920s action films
1920s English-language films
American silent feature films
American action films
Films directed by James W. Horne
American black-and-white films
Films with screenplays by Garrett Fort
1920s American films
Silent action films